Tibor Méray (6 April 1924 – 12 November 2020) was a Hungarian journalist and writer, worked for various newspapers (Szabad Nép, Csillag) during the Communist regime. He was a war correspondent for Szabad Nép (official daily of the ruling communist Hungarian Working People's Party and predecessor of the Népszabadság) during the Korean War.

As a supporter of the politics of Imre Nagy, he fled the country after the abortive uprising of 1956 and became a staunch anti-Communist, living in Paris, France. After working for several journals, he was editor-in-chief of the Irodalmi Újság, an important emigrant Hungarian-language weekly in Paris, from 1971 to 1989.

He co-wrote the 1969 comedy spy novel Catch Me a Spy, which was later adapted into a 1971 film To Catch a Spy starring Kirk Douglas.

Tibor Méray died on 12 November 2020 in Paris.

References

External links
Biography of Tibor Méray

1924 births
2020 deaths
Hungarian journalists
Hungarian male writers
Writers from Budapest
Hungarian defectors
Attila József Prize recipients
Hungarian expatriates in France
War correspondents of the Korean War
Hungarian anti-communists